Marjan Kolev (born 4 April 1977) is a former Macedonian handball player who played for the Macedonian national team. He is currently a coach in French club OGC Nice.

Career
As a player Kolev started out in Vardar. At the club in two spells he won eight domestic titles. The club also reached the third place in the 1998-99 EHF Cup Winners' Cup. For two years he played for Tutunski Kombinat Prilep who won the Macedonian Handball Cup in 2002.
For the second part of 2004-05 season, he moved to Italian top club Pallamano Trieste, and stayed in Italy until the end of the season. After the italian experience, Kolev moved to Croatian side Zamet Rijeka where he played for one season finishing in sixth place with the club after championship play-offs. He played in France for Villefranche, Gonfreville, Montélimar and St-Egrève before retiring.

Honours
RK Vardar
Macedonian Handball Super League (4): 1998-99, 2001-02, 2002-03, 2003-04
Macedonian Handball Cup (4): 1997, 2000, 2003, 2004
EHF Cup Winners' Cup third place (1): 1998-99

Tutunski Kombinat
Macedonian Handball Cup (1): 2002

References

External links
Kolev EHF Profile
Marjan Kolev

1977 births
Living people
Macedonian male handball players
RK Zamet players
Sportspeople from Skopje
Macedonian expatriate sportspeople in France
Macedonian expatriate sportspeople in Croatia
Macedonian expatriate sportspeople in Turkey
Expatriate handball players